Krishna Pratap Singh is a member of the Bharatiya Janata Party and has won the 2014 Indian general elections from the Jaunpur (Lok Sabha constituency).

Early life and education

Krishna Pratap Singh was born on 9 February 1977 to Shri Umanath Singh and Smt. Susheela Singh. He was born in Jaunpur in Uttar Pradesh. His educational qualifications include Ph.D. and he received his education from T.D.P.G. College, Jaunpur and Purwanchal University Jaunpur, Uttar Pradesh. He married Reena Singh on 23 November 2005. He started his social career as RSS worker at the age of 15 after the sad demise of his father Late Uma Nath Singh who was the minister in Kalyan Singh led Uttar Pradesh Govt. Uma Nath Singh died on 13 September 1993 due to a sudden heart attack in Police kotwali, jaunpur after struggle with unsocial element in 1993 who were the part of an agitation named halla bool of samajvadi-bsp alliance government. Earlier Umanath singh was four time MLA belonging to Jansangh and bjp from Bayalasi assembly constituency of Jaunpur. he was first elected in 1967 at the very young age and defeated congress iconic leader Lal Bahadur singh. KP started a RSS shakha in TD college campus and took various social service programme in the name of his father like eye surgery camp, regular blood donation camp, coaching classes for economically backward community.

Political career

May, 2014: Elected to 16th Lok Sabha
1 Sep. 2014 onwards: Member, Standing Committee on Chemicals and Fertilizers; Member, Consultative Committee, Ministry of Water Resources, River Development and Ganga Rejuvenation

References

Living people
India MPs 2014–2019
People from Jaunpur district
Lok Sabha members from Uttar Pradesh
Bharatiya Janata Party politicians from Uttar Pradesh
1977 births